Thout 8 - Coptic Calendar - Thout 10

The ninth day of the Coptic month of Thout, the first month of the Coptic year. On a common year, this day corresponds to September 6, of the Julian Calendar, and September 19, of the Gregorian Calendar. This day falls in the Coptic season of Akhet, the season of inundation.

Commemorations

Feasts 

 Coptic New Year Period

Saints 
 The martyrdom of Saint Pisora the Bishop
 The martyrdom of the honorable Bishops, Pilus and Nylios

References 

Days of the Coptic calendar